Bolitoglossa insularis is a species of salamander in the family Plethodontidae.
It is endemic to Nicaragua.
Its habitat includes  premontane moist forests.

References

Bolitoglossa
Endemic fauna of Nicaragua
Amphibians described in 2008